The 1951 San Francisco 49ers season was the franchise's 2nd season in the National Football League and their 6th overall. The team was coming off a 3–9 record in 1950.

The 49ers won their first ever NFL road game on October 14 against the Pittsburgh Steelers, after losing their first 7 in the league. The Niners were in playoff contention all year long, finishing 7–4–1, just a half game out of first place in the National Conference. Their biggest win of the season was a 44–17 victory over their California rivals, the Los Angeles Rams.

Frankie Albert and Y. A. Tittle split time at quarterback, with Albert throwing for 1,116 yards, while Tittle led the club with 8 TDs and completed 55.3% of his passes. Joe Perry once again led the team in rushing with 677 yards and 3 TDs, and wide receiver Gordie Soltau led the club with 59 catches for 826 yards and 7 TDs.

NFL draft

Regular season

Schedule

Game summaries

Week 1: vs. Cleveland Browns

Week 2: at Philadelphia Eagles

Week 3: at Pittsburgh Steelers

Week 4: at Chicago Bears

Week 5: vs. Los Angeles Rams

Week 6: at Los Angeles Rams

Week 7: vs. New York Yanks

Week 8: vs. Chicago Cardinals

Week 9: at New York Yanks

Week 10: at Detroit Lions

Week 11: vs. Green Bay Packers

Week 12: vs. Detroit Lions

Standings

Pro Bowl
San Francisco's players selected for the Pro Bowl:

References

External links
1951 49ers on Pro Football Reference
SHRP Sports

San Francisco 49ers
San Francisco 49ers seasons